Okinawan martial arts refers to the martial arts, such as karate, tegumi and Okinawan kobudō, which originated among the indigenous people of Okinawa Island. Due to its central location, Okinawa was influenced by various cultures with a long history of trade and cultural exchange, including Japan, China and Southeast Asia, that greatly influenced the development of martial arts on Okinawa.

History
In 1429, the three kingdoms on Okinawa unified to form the Kingdom of Ryukyu. When King Shō Shin came into power in 1477, he banned the practice of martial arts, due to fears of the widespread teaching of the art of deception. Tō-te and Ryukyu kobudō (deception) continued to be taught in secret. The ban was continued in 1609 after Okinawa was invaded by the Satsuma Domain of Japan. The bans contributed to the development of kobudō  which uses common household and farming implements as weaponry. The Okinawans combined Chinese martial arts with the existing local variants to form , sometimes called .

By the 18th century, different types of Te had developed in three different villages – Shuri, Naha and Tomari. The styles were named Shuri-te, Naha-te, and Tomari-te, respectively.

Well into the 20th century, the martial arts of Okinawa were generally referred to as te and tii 手 in Japanese and Okinawan for "hand". Te often varied from one town to another, so to distinguish among the various types of te, the word was often prefaced with its area of origin; for example, Naha-te, Shuri-te, or Tomari-te.

Shuri-te, Naha-te and Tomari-te belong to a family of martial arts that were collectively defined as Tode-jutsu or To-de.

Karate (Okinawa-te or Karate-jutsu) was systematically taught in Japan after the Taishō era (after 1926).

Shuri-te

 is a pre-World War II term for a type of indigenous martial art to the area around Shuri, the old capital city of the Ryukyu Kingdom.

Important Okinawan masters of Shuri-te:
 Sakukawa Kanga
 Matsumura Sōkon
 Itosu Ankō
 Asato Ankō
 Chōyū Motobu
 Motobu Chōki
 Yabu Kentsū
 Chōmo Hanashiro
 Funakoshi Gichin
 Kyan Chōtoku
 Chibana Chōshin
 Mabuni Kenwa
 Tōyama Kanken
 Tatsuo Shimabuku

Important kata:
 Naihanchi
 sanchin (shuri te)
 Pinan
 Kūsankū
 Passai
 Jion
 Jitte
 Rohai
 Chinto
 Gojushiho

The successor styles to Shuri-te include  Shotokan, Shitō-ryū, Shōrin-ryū, Shudokan, Shuri-ryū, Shōrinji-ryū, Shorei-Ryu, Gōjū-ryū, Isshin-ryū, Gensei-ryu and Motobu-ryū.

Tomari-te

 refers to a tradition of martial arts originating from the village of Tomari, Okinawa.

Important Okinawan masters of Tomari-te:
 Matsumora Kōsaku
 Oyadomari Kokan
 Motobu Chōki
 Kyan Chōtoku
 Nakasone Seiyu

Important kata: 
 Naihanchi (Koshiki)
 Eunibu
 Rōhai
 Wanduan
 Passai (Tomari)
 Chintō 
 Chinsu
 Chinpu
 Wankan
 Wanshū
 Seisan
 Jumu
 Nichin
 Juma
 Ananku
The successor styles to Tomari-te include Wado-ryu, Motobu-ryū, Matsubayashi-ryu and Shōrinji-ryū

Naha-te

 is a pre-World War II term for a type of martial art indigenous to the area around Naha, the old commercial city of the Ryukyu Kingdom and now the capital city of Okinawa Prefecture.

Important Okinawan masters of Naha-te:

 Arakaki Seishō
 Higaonna Kanryō
 Miyagi Chōjun
 Kyoda Jūhatsu
 Mabuni Kenwa
 Uechi Kanbun

Important kata:

 Sanchin
 Saifā
 Seiunchin
 Shisochin
 Seipai
 Seisan
 Sanseru
 Tensho
 Kururunfa
 Suparinpei

The successor styles to Naha-te include Shōrei-ryū (earliest school), Gōjū-ryū, Uechi-ryū, Ryūei-ryū, Shito-ryu  and Tōon-ryū.

See also
 Okinawa
 Karate
 Japanese martial arts
 Peichin

References

 

 
Ryukyu Kingdom
Japanese martial arts